Blaydes House is a grade II* listed Georgian house in High Street, Kingston upon Hull, England. Built in the 18th century for the Blaydes family, it is now owned by the University of Hull's Maritime Historical Studies Centre.

History

Blaydes House was built in the late 1730s or early 1740s (the precise date is unknown) as the residence and business premises of the Blaydes family, one of the leading merchant families in the town and also owners of two shipyards, Blaydes Yard: the North End Dock on the River Hull, near the house, and another at Hessle Cliff, close to the northern end of the present-day Humber Bridge.  The yards turned out vessels for the Royal Navy from the 1740s, but their main output was merchant ships, most famous among which was a collier named Bethia, which was purchased by the Navy in 1787, adapted and renamed HMS Bounty.

The Blaydes family were also prominent in town politics, Benjamin Blaydes (whose initials can be seen in a carved monogram in the hallway ceiling) serving as Chamberlain in 1736.  The family probably remained at the house until the early 19th century, by that time trading as part of the Blaydes Loft Gee & Company partnership.  After this firm was wound up the family left Hull and sold the house.  Subsequently, it was used as office space by a number of local businesses.

In May 1941, during the Hull Blitz, a large office building immediately to the south was destroyed by a direct hit, but Blaydes House received only light damage.

Current use

After a period of disuse the house was purchased by the Georgian Society for East Yorkshire.  In 1999 it was sold to the University of Hull and refurbished to become the headquarters of the university's Maritime Historical Studies Centre.

Trivia

Blaydes House was the location used in the Cutters music video "Saviour" directed by John James Fox.

References

Literature
 Frances Bibby (2006) The Blaydes: shipbuilders of Hull.
(This work has been criticised as follows: "... very thorough as far as it goes (but) some information (was) misunderstood due to the complex relationships within this family (for example at the time of the ownership of the Blaydes House by the merchant Benjamin Blaydes, there were two other close cousins also named Benjamin).  She has also missed the main line of male descent within the family.  The line of descent in Burke's Landed Gentry is correct.  Family Information prior to 1500 listed in Burke's is incorrect and was due to fraudulent research in the middle 1800s.  These lines have now been sorted (you need to follow the major property bequests in the wills to follow the correct lines, and also understand that they did not follow the standard convention of oldest male inheriting everything,)  (Mark Blaydes)"

External links

 Maritime Historical Studies Centre
  aa42.com Blaydes summary concerning ship-building in Hull, and especially the history of the Blaydes Family

Historic houses in Kingston upon Hull
Grade II* listed buildings in the East Riding of Yorkshire
Grade II* listed houses